Divergence is a function that associates a scalar with every point of a vector field.

Divergence or Divergent may also refer to:

Mathematics

 Divergence (computer science), a computation which does not terminate (or terminates in an exceptional state)
 Divergence, the defining property of divergent series; series that do not converge to a finite limit
 Divergence, a result of instability of a dynamical system in stability theory

Statistics
 Divergence (statistics), a measure of dissimilarity between probability measures
 Bregman divergence
 f-divergence
 Jensen–Shannon divergence
 Kullback–Leibler divergence, also known as the "information divergence" in probability theory and information theory
 Rényi's divergence

Science
 Divergent boundary, a linear feature that exists between tectonic plates that are moving away from each other
 Divergence (eye), the simultaneous outward movement of both eyes away from each other
 Divergence problem, an anomaly between the instrumental record and temperatures calculated using some tree ring proxies
 Beam divergence, the half-angle of the cone formed by a beam of light as it propagates and spreads out
 Genetic divergence, the process in which two or more populations of an ancestral species accumulate independent genetic changes
 Evolutionary divergence, the accumulation of differences between populations of closely related species
 Infrared divergence, due to contributions of objects with low energy
 Ultraviolet divergence, due to contributions of objects with very high energy
 Divergence (optics), the angle formed between spreading rays of light

Arts
 Divergent (book series), a novel series of young adult science fiction adventure novels by Veronica Roth
 Divergent (novel), the first novel in the series, 2011
The Divergent Series, a film trilogy based on the novels
 Divergent (film), the 2014 film based on the novel
 Divergent (soundtrack), the soundtrack to the 2014 film
 Divergence (novel), a 1991 novel by Charles Sheffield
 Divergence, a 2007 novel by Tony Ballantyne
 Divergence (album), a 1972 album by Solution
 "Divergence" (Star Trek: Enterprise), a fourth-season episode of Star Trek: Enterprise
 Divergence (film), a 2005 film from Hong Kong
 Diverge (film), a 2016 American sci-fi film
 Diverged (The Walking Dead), an episode of the television series The Walking Dead

See also
 Convergence (disambiguation)